Ride may refer to:

People
 MC Ride, a member of Death Grips
 Sally Ride (1951–2012), American astronaut
 William Ride (19262011), Australian zoologist

Arts, entertainment, and media

Films
 Ride (1998 film), a 1998 comedy by Millicent Shelton
 Ride, a 2004 short film by Stephen Sinclair
 Ride (2009 film), a Telugu film
 Ride (2012 film), an American short music film.
 Ride (2014 film), an American drama film starring Helen Hunt
 Ride (2018 film), a 2018 film with American actress Bella Thorne

Games
 Ride (video game), 2015 video game
 Tony Hawk: Ride, a video game

Music

Albums
 Ride (Billy Crawford album)
 Ride (EP), by Ride
 Ride (Shelly Fairchild album)
 Ride (Godspeed album)
 Ride (Jo Hikk album)
 Ride (Boney James album)
 Ride (Loreen album)
 Ride (Oysterband album)
 Ride (Jamie Walters album)
 R.I.D.E. (pronounced "Ride"), album by Trick Pony
 Ride, by NaNa

Songs
 "Ride" (Ace Hood song), 2018
 "Ride" (Baker Boy song), featuring Yirrmal, 2021
 "Ride" (Ciara song), 2010
 "Ride" (Lana Del Rey song), 2012
 "Ride" (Lenny Kravitz song), 2018
 "Ride" (Martina McBride song), 2008
 "Ride" (SoMo song), 2013
 "Ride" (Twenty One Pilots song), 2015
 "Ride" (the Vines song), 2004
 "Ride" (ZZ Ward song), featuring Gary Clark Jr., 2017
 "Ride!", by Dee Dee Sharp, 1963
 "Ride", a contemporary concert band piece composed by Samuel Hazo
 "Ride", an instrumental from Bond's album Shine
 "Ride", by Beautiful Creatures, from the album Beautiful Creatures
 "Ride", by Caravan, from the album Caravan
 "Ride", by Cary Brothers, from the album Who You Are
 "Ride", by Chase Rice, from the album Ignite the Night
 "Ride", by Shea Couleé from the album Couleé-D
 "Ride", by The Dandy Warhols, from the album Dandys Rule OK
 "Ride", by Deepsky, from the album In Silico
 "Ride", by Empire of the Sun, from the album Two Vines
 "Ride", by Joe Satriani, from the album Flying in a Blue Dream
 "Ride", by Liz Phair, from the album whitechocolatespaceegg
 "Ride", by Max Ehrich, written for the film Walk. Ride. Rodeo.
 "Ride", by Rob Zombie, from the album Educated Horses
 "Ride", by Robyn Hitchcock, from the album Perspex Island
 "Ride", by Royce da 5'9", from the album Independent's Day
 "Ride", by Sir Mix-a-Lot, from the album Chief Boot Knocka
 "Ride", by Trace Adkins, from the album Dangerous Man
 "Ride", by Usher, from the album Confessions

Other uses in music
 Ride (band), English rock band
 Ride, musical improvisation, common in early jazz
 Ride cymbal, the standard cymbal in most drum kits

Other uses in arts, entertainment, and media
 Ride (TV series), a drama TV series on YTV and Nickelodeon
 Ride, a 2002 novel by David Walton
 RIDE: A Review Journal for Digital Editions and Resources, a peer-reviewed academic journal published by the Institut für Dokumentologie und Editorik

Other uses
 Amusement ride
 Bridleway, or ride, a track through woodland for horse riders
 Reduce Impaired Driving Everywhere, a sobriety-testing program used by Canadian police
 Rhode Island Department of Education
 Ride quality, how well a vehicle copes with uneven surfaces
 Road Improvement and Development Effort, a highway program in South Carolina
 Rural Institute for Development Education, an NGO based in Tamil Nadu, India

See also
 Midnight Ride (disambiguation)
 Rider (disambiguation)
 Rides (disambiguation)
 Riding (disambiguation)
 The Ride (disambiguation)